Pascoe Vale South is a suburb in Melbourne, Victoria, Australia,  north of Melbourne's Central Business District, located within the City of Merri-bek local government area. Pascoe Vale South recorded a population of 10,534 at the 2021 census.

Pascoe Vale South adjoins Brunswick West to the south, Strathmore and the Moonee Ponds Creek to the west, Coburg to the east, and Pascoe Vale to the north. The suburb also borders the Tullamarine Freeway.

Major features of the suburb include the Bell Street/Melville Road Shopping area.

History

The Pascoe Vale area was part of the original John Pascoe Fawkner property "Pascoeville". In 1841, Dr Farquhar McCrae, a wealthy surgeon, purchased land called 'La Rose' in what is now known as Pascoe Vale South. The house he built in 1842 or 1843 is now known as Wentworth House, and is the oldest known private dwelling in Victoria still standing on its original site, and the fifth oldest building in Victoria. It is located at 22 Le Cateau Street, Pascoe Vale South.

Significant development of Pascoe Vale South took place after the tramline was extended to Bell Street in 1927, with the post office opening on 1 August 1927.

Demographics

According to data from the 2021 census, 10,534 people lived in Pascoe Vale South.

Pascoe Vale South is primarily a family residential suburb with above average income (the median personal income being $953 in Pascoe Vale South, compared to the national average of $805), above average education (36.1% of people aged 15+ holding a bachelor's degree compared with 26.3% nationwide) and relatively low unemployment (3.6% compared to 5.1% nationwide). 

Pascoe Vale South is less culturally diverse than other suburbs of Merri-bek, and even lower than the Melbourne average.

In Pascoe Vale South, 74.6% of people were born in Australia. The next most common countries of birth were Italy 4.7%, Greece 2.7%, England 1.5%, India 1.2% and India 1.1%.

The most common responses for religion in Pascoe Vale South were No Religion, so described 34.9%, Catholic 33.0%, Eastern Orthodox 12.0%, Not stated 3.9% and Anglican 3.4%. In Pascoe Vale South, Christianity was the largest religious group reported overall (56.2%) (this figure excludes not stated responses).

In Pascoe Vale South, 68.4% of people only spoke English at home. Other languages spoken at home included Greek 8.4%, Italian 7.9%, Arabic 2%, Mandarin 1.1% and Vietnamese 1.1%.

Transport

Bus
Eight bus routes service Pascoe Vale South:
 : Essendon station – Ivanhoe station via Brunswick, Northcote and Thornbury. Operated by Moreland Buslines.
 : Strathmore station – East Coburg via Pascoe Vale South, Coburg West and Coburg. Operated by Moreland Buslines.
 : Eltham station – Glenroy station via Lower Plenty. Operated by Dysons.
 : Eltham station – Glenroy station via Greensborough. Operated by Dysons.
 : Gowrie station – Northland Shopping Centre via Murray Road. Operated by Ventura Bus Lines.
 : Macleod – Pascoe Vale station via La Trobe University. Operated by Dysons.
  : Altona station – Mordialloc. Operated by Kinetic Melbourne.
  : Brunswick station – Glenroy station via West Coburg (operates Saturday and Sunday mornings only). Operated by Ventura Bus Lines.

Cycling
For cyclists, the suburb adjoins the Moonee Ponds Creek Trail to the west.

Train
Pascoe Vale station, on the Craigieburn line, is the nearest railway station to Pascoe Vale South. Other stations nearby include Batman, Coburg and Moreland, all on the Upfield line.

Tram
Tram route  provides public transport through the suburb, from the Bell Street terminus and along Melville Road, to the city.

Educational facilities

Pascoe Vale South has a government primary school (Pascoe Vale South Primary School) and two catholic schools.

Neighbourhoods

The neighbourhood of Coonans Hill is in the south of the suburb. Its post office (now closed) opened on 21 February 1957.

Landmarks

The following places in Pascoe Vale South are listed on the Victorian Heritage Register:
 H0138	Wentworth House, 22 Le Cateau  Street Pascoe Vale South
 H0964	Lyndhurst Hall, 44 Walhalla Street, Pascoe Vale South

See also
 City of Coburg – Pascoe Vale South was previously within this former local government area.

References

Suburbs of Melbourne
Suburbs of the City of Merri-bek